John Edie may refer to:
 John Edie (New Zealand politician) (1856–1928), member of parliament in Otago, New Zealand
 John Rufus Edie (1814–1888), member of the U.S. House of Representatives

See also
John Eddie (born 1959), American rock singer
John Eadie (1810–1876), Scottish theologian
John Eadie (cricketer) (1861–1923), English brewer and cricketer
John Eddy (disambiguation)